The Indian cricket team toured Bangladesh from 10 to 24 June 2015. The tour consisted of one Test match and three One Day International (ODI) matches. Because of the series taking place during monsoon season, each ODI had a reserve day allocated. The one-off Test finished in a draw and Bangladesh won the ODI series 2–1.

Squads
On 4 June, Bangladesh's Mahmudullah was ruled out of the series after fracturing his finger in training. Two days later, India's KL Rahul was ruled out of the Test match because of illness.

Test series

Only Test

ODI series

1st ODI

2nd ODI

3rd ODI

References

External links
 Series home at ESPN Cricinfo

2015 in Bangladeshi cricket
2015 in Indian cricket
International cricket competitions in 2015
Indian cricket tours of Bangladesh